Train To End Stroke is an endurance training and fund-raising program, benefiting the American Stroke Association, a division of the American Heart Association, in which participants train to run or walk a full or half marathon.

See also
List of health related charity fundraisers

External links
Official Website

Health-related fundraisers
American Heart Association